The Konstal 13N was an electric tram built by Konstal in Chorzów between 1959 and 1969 and used in Warsaw until 2012. The design borrowed heavily from the PCC-derived ČKD Tatra T1.

History 
After 1945, the tram networks in most Polish cities relied on small, slow, and outdated Konstal N trams. The N-class trams were intended as a temporary measure to quickly improve the disastrous state of public transport in the aftermath of World War II, and were in fact based on a wartime German design, but all attempts at designing a better tram in Poland ended in failure.

In 1955, two Tatra T1 trams were bought by the Warsaw Transport Authority. In 1956, these were sent to the Konstal works in Chorzów for analysis, and formed the basis for the first Konstal prototype called 11N. The prototype was then modernized with a redesigned interior, Belgian ACEC electrical equipment, different wheels, and transmission. In 1959, the prototype was put into production as the 13N.

Passenger service 
Konstal 13N was a single-module unidirectional tram with three doors on the right side. It held 122 passengers and was capable of reaching 68 km/h. They were most often used in sets of two, though in peak times, and on particularly busy routes, sets of three were sometimes seen. Although early units suffered from reliability issues, these were soon rectified.

The 13N remained in production for 10 years, and in that time, 842 units were built – 838 of those served in Warsaw, and the other four in the Upper Silesian network.  The 13N (together with the later 105Na) went on to form the backbone of the Warsaw tram network for over 50 years. 

Due to their shape, they were nicknamed parówka (sausage) and given stock numbers 1-500 and 503-840  (the original Tatra T1 cars were numbered 501 and 502).

In the 21st century, with the need for more energy-efficient, easier-to-access low-floor trams, the 13N units were phased out and replaced by PESA 120Na. The last day of passenger service on a 13N was 31 December 2012.

Later development 
Konstal 13N also forms the basis for the company's other trams seen in all Polish cities with tram networks. Konstal 102N (produced 1967–1969) and the subsequent 102Na (1970–1973) are both articulated versions of the 13N, and the Konstal 105N started out as 13N in a more modern, lighter body.

Today 

No 13N trams remain in regular passenger service after 2012, but several serve as museum cars in Warsaw (#795 since 1996, #503, the first 13N ever built, since 2018 and modernised, called "Żaba" #821 in composition with #818 since 2013), and Silesia (ex #366, now #308 since 2013). Due to their sturdiness, a number of 13Ns have also been rebuilt as track maintenance vehicles (#388 amongst others).

Gallery

References

External links

 Old photographs of 13N (PL)
 History of 13N (PL)
 New life of 13N as a track maintenance vehicle (PL)
 A Konstal 15N prototype never put into production

Tram vehicles of Poland